

Events

Publications 
Felice Anerio
Giammateo Asola
 (Venice: heirs of Girolamo Scotto), also includes four other motets
... (Venice: Giacomo Vincenti & Ricciardo Amadino), in two parts
Ippolito Baccusi – Second book of masses, for five, six, and eight voices (Venice: Giacomo Vincenti & Ricciardo Amadino)
Giovanni Bassano
Fantasies for three voices (Venice: Giacomo Vincenti & Ricciardo Amadino)
 (Venice: Giacomo Vincenti & Ricciardo Amadino), a collection of examples of instrumental ornamentation.
Girolamo Belli
 for four voices (Venice: Giacomo Vincenti & Ricciardo Amadino), a collection of music for Vespers, including psalms, hymns, and a Magnificat
Second book of madrigals for five voices (Venice: Giacomo Vincenti & Ricciardo Amadino)
Joan Brudieu – Madrigals for four voices (Barcelona: Hubert Gotard)
Joachim a Burck –  for four voices (Mühlhausen: Georg Hantzsch), settings of hymn texts by Ludwig Helmbold
Gioseppe Caimo – Fourth book of madrigals for five voices (Milan: Pietro Tini)
Giovanni Croce – First book of madrigals for five voices (Venice: Angelo Gardano)
Johannes Eccard –   for six voicer (Königsberg: Georg Osterberger), a wedding song
Stefano Felis
Second book of motets for five, six, and eight voices (Venice: Angelo Gardano)
Fourth book of madrigals for five voices (Venice: Giacomo Vincenti & Ricciardo Amadino)
Ruggiero Giovannelli – , his first book of madrigals for four voices (Rome: Alessandro Grandi)
Gioseffo Guami – First book of motets for five, six, seven, eight, and ten voices (Venice: Giacomo Vincenti & Ricciardo Amadino)
Francisco Guerrero –  (Rome: Alessandro Gardano)
Paolo Isnardi –  for four voices (Venice: Giacomo Vincenti & Ricciardo Amadino)
Jacobus de Kerle –  for four, five, and eight voices (Prague: Georg Nigrinus)
Orlande de Lassus
 for four voices (Munich: Adam Berg)
 for six and eight voices (Munich: Adam Berg)
Lamentations for five voices (Munich: Adam Berg)
Madrigals for five voices (Nuremberg: Catharina Gerlach)
Claude Le Jeune –  (Antwerp: Christophe Plantin), a collection of chansons
Luca Marenzio
Third book of madrigals for six voices (Venice: heirs of Girolamo Scotto)
Fifth book of madrigals for five voices (Venice: heirs of Girolamo Scotto)
First book of madrigals for four voices (Rome: Alessandro Gardano)
Rinaldo del Mel
Third book of motets for five and six voices (Venice: Angelo Gardano)
First book of madrigals for five and six voices (Venice: heirs of Girolamo Scotto)
Philippe de Monte – First book of motets for six and twelve voices (Venice: Angelo Gardano)
Benedetto Pallavicino – Third book of madrigals for five voices (Venice: Giacomo Vincenti & Ricciardo Amadino)
Costanzo Porta – Third book of motets for six voices (Venice: Angelo Gardano)

Classical music 
Giovanni Pierluigi da Palestrina – Missa tu es pastor ovium

Musical theatre 
Andrea Gabrielli – Choruses for the play Edippo Tiranno, performed in Vicenza

Births 
October 8 (JC) – Heinrich Schütz, German composer (died 1672)
date unknown
Johann Grabbe, composer (died 1655)
Wojciech Dębołęcki, Franciscan friar, writer and composer (died 1646)
probable – Domenico Allegri, singer and composer (died 1629)
Andrea Falconieri, composer (died 1653)

Deaths 
August 30 – Andrea Gabrieli, organist and composer (born c.1532)
November 28 – Hernando Franco, composer (born 1532)
December 3 – Thomas Tallis, church musician and composer (born 1505)

 
Music
16th century in music
Music by year